Jaret Samuel Wright (born December 29, 1975) is an American former professional baseball pitcher. He played all or parts of 11 seasons in Major League Baseball for the Cleveland Indians, San Diego Padres, Atlanta Braves, New York Yankees, and Baltimore Orioles, primarily as a starting pitcher.

Early life and education
Wright was born on December 29, 1975, in Anaheim, California, and is the son of Clyde Wright, who himself pitched for nine seasons in the major leagues and three seasons in the Japanese equivalent. Wright graduated from Katella High School in Anaheim, where he also played quarterback and linebacker for the football team. He was named league MVP and High School Player of the Year by the Orange County Register and Los Angeles Times.

Professional career
Jaret was drafted out of high school by the Cleveland Indians in the 1st round (10th pick overall) of the 1994 Major League Baseball draft. Following the draft, Wright began his professional career with the Burlington Indians, the team's rookie league affiliate in the Appalachian League. The 18-year-old started in four games and had a 5.40 ERA.

For 1995, Jaret progressed to the Class A Columbus RedStixx in the South Atlantic League, where he went 5–6 with a 3.00 ERA in 24 games. In 1996, he moved up to the Kinston Indians, the team's "High-A" affiliate in the Carolina League. He went 7–4 in 19 starts, with a 2.50 ERA. Baseball America rated Wright as its #22 prospect and was regularly mentioned by the Cleveland front office as one of the organization's top prospects.

The following year, 1997, was a breakout season for Jaret. He started with the Akron Aeros, the Double-A in the Eastern League, where he went 3–3 with a 3.67 ERA. He was quickly promoted to the Triple-A Buffalo Bisons, going 4–1 in 7 starts and sported an impressive 1.80 ERA. On June 3, he pitched a 7-inning, 2-hit shutout against the Indianapolis Indians. That earned Wright a promotion to the big club when a spot opened up.

Major leagues
Jaret made his major league debut in 1997 with the Indians. The team was a top contender, having made the playoffs the prior two years and included a trip to the 1995 World Series. However, injuries to starters like Jack McDowell and inconsistency from Albie Lopez and Brian Anderson forced the team to bring up its top pitching prospect.

Jaret found instant success. He posted an 8–3 record with a 4.38 ERA in 16 starts, and also pitched effectively in the postseason, which is rare for a rookie. In the deciding game 7 of the 1997 World Series, the Indians decided to start Wright on three days' rest, rather than the usual five. Charles Nagy had been the probable starter. Wright left the game after  innings with a 2–1 lead; however, the Indians would lose in 11 innings. He finished fifth in the American League Rookie of the Year Award voting.

Jaret would follow that up with a .500 season (12–12 with a 4.72 ERA) in 1998. He never got the chance to reach his potential in Cleveland due to a chronic shoulder injury that would first crop up in 1999, when he went 8–10 with a 6.06 ERA in 26 starts, and would later require two surgeries to repair, costing him parts of the following three seasons.

After going 2–3 with a 15.71 ERA in 2002, the Indians decided not to re-sign Jaret. He became a free agent, and signed with the San Diego Padres in early 2003. He did not fare well in San Diego, going 1–5 with an 8.73 ERA in 39 games, all in relief. He was traded to the Atlanta Braves in August. He did not allow a run in all but one of his 11 appearances with the Braves, going 1–0 with a 2.00 ERA, and was told that he was going to be made a starting pitcher again for the next season.

Jaret started 2004 in the minors to build up arm strength, but was called up by the Braves when it was discovered pitcher Paul Byrd needed more time to rehab his arm (he had missed the entire 2003 season due to Tommy John surgery). Wright became the Braves best pitcher that season, going 15–8 with a 3.28 ERA in 32 starts while amassing 159 strikeouts in  innings pitched.

In December 2004, Wright signed a three-year, US$21 million deal with the New York Yankees.

On November 12, 2006, the Yankees traded Jaret to the Baltimore Orioles for Chris Britton and cash considerations. The Orioles were responsible for paying only $3 million of the $7 million left on Wright's contract.

Jaret's shoulder problems returned in the 2007 season and caused him to spend time on the disabled list twice; he did make three starts in April, each five innings or less, but lost all three of them and accumulated a 6.97 ERA. The Orioles reported that Wright's velocity was also down. Wright had started a rehab assignment in September and after 3 games he decided to go home ending the rest of the season and maybe his career. On October 1, 2007, the Orioles released Wright.

On January 23, 2008, Wright signed a minor league contract with the Pittsburgh Pirates, which included an invitation to spring training. At the end of spring training, he declined his assignment to the minor leagues and elected to become a free agent. He went unsigned, and never pitched professionally again.

When Jaret broke in with Cleveland Indians, he threw a two-seam fastball that topped out at 98 MPH, along with a hard curveball and a changeup. After battling numerous shoulder injuries, his fastball topped out in the low 90s.

Personal life
Wright lives in San Clemente, California, with his wife Julie and their four children: Gunnar, Jett, Memphis, and Sloan.

See also
 List of second-generation Major League Baseball players

References

External links

Jaret Wright: Behind the Dugout

Major League Baseball pitchers
Cleveland Indians players
San Diego Padres players
Atlanta Braves players
New York Yankees players
Baltimore Orioles players
Burlington Indians players (1986–2006)
Columbus RedStixx players
Kinston Indians players
Akron Aeros players
Buffalo Bisons (minor league) players
Portland Beavers players
Gulf Coast Yankees players
Tampa Yankees players
Frederick Keys players
Bowie Baysox players
Baseball players from Anaheim, California
1975 births
Living people